Oliver Wagner Speraw (March 26, 1921 – February 21, 2014) served in the California State Senate for the 31st district from 1979 to 1984 and during World War II he served in the United States Air Force.

References

External links
Join California Ollie Speraw

United States Army Air Forces personnel of World War II
1921 births
2014 deaths
Republican Party California state senators
20th-century American politicians